Luka Prso is an Australian professional footballer who plays as a midfielder for SV Stripfing
.

Club career
In October 2020, Prso joined Osijek on a three-year deal, later being loaned out to A-League side Newcastle Jets for the rest of the season.

A year later, in October 2021, Prso negotiated an early release from Osijek and joined A-League club Wellington Phoenix for the 2021–22 A-League Men season.

In January 2022, Prso joined Melbourne Victory on a 1.5 year deal after leaving Wellington Phoenix.

International career
Prso is eligible to play for Croatia, Australia and Serbia at international level and has been involved in the youth squads of the latter two.

Personal life
Prso is the nephew of former Croatian international footballer Dado Pršo.

References

External links

2001 births
Living people
Australian soccer players
Association football midfielders
GNK Dinamo Zagreb players
NK Olimpija Ljubljana (2005) players
NK Osijek players
Newcastle Jets FC players
Wellington Phoenix FC players
Melbourne Victory FC players
A-League Men players

Australian people of Croatian descent 
Australian people of Serbian descent